Baghmundi Government Polytechnic , is a government polytechnic located in Baghmundi,  Purulia district, West Bengal. Baghmundi is a block town in the lap of Ajodhya Hills of Purulia district. This polytechnic is affiliated to the West Bengal State Council of Technical Education,  and recognized by AICTE, New Delhi. This polytechnic offers diploma courses in Electrical, Mechanical & Civil Engineering.

References

External links

Universities and colleges in Purulia district
Technical universities and colleges in West Bengal
Educational institutions in India with year of establishment missing